Parnaibaia is a genus of coelacanth fish which lived during the Late Jurassic period. Fossils of Parnaibaia have been found in the Pastos Bons Formation in Maranhão, Brazil. Parnaibaia was described for the first time by palaeontologist Yoshitaka Yabumoto in 2008.

References

Further reading 
 

Prehistoric lobe-finned fish genera
Jurassic bony fish
Late Jurassic fish
Prehistoric fish of South America
Jurassic Brazil
Fossils of Brazil
Fossil taxa described in 2008